Indestructible is the seventh studio album by Elvis Crespo. It was released on December 14, 2010.

Track listing
"Indestructible" (introduction)
"Romántico"
"15 Inviernos" (featuring Zone D'Tambora)
"Dulce, Salada"
"Tu Paño"
"Hey Dude!"
"Un Día Fuiste Una Flor" (featuring Bachata Heightz)
"Solita"
"Algo Heavy"
"La Novia Bella"
"Mi Problema" (featuring Omega & Voltio)

Elvis Crespo albums
2010 albums